John Hull (by 1503 – 10 or 16 September 1549), of Larkbeare, Exeter, Devon, was an English lawyer and politician. He was the MP for Exeter from 1539 to 1542 with William Hurst, and again in 1547–49 with Griffith Ameredith. At the time Exeter was one of the wealthiest cities in England, rivaling London. His main work was a bill and subsequent project to widen and dredge the river Exe. It is thought that he became a member of parliament for the purpose of securing an inheritance denied him by Sir John Paulet.

He is not to be confused with the 14th century mayor of Exeter of the same name.

Early life and family
Hull was the son of John Hull of Larkbeare and his wife Joan née Trickhay, daughter of Nicholas Trickhay. His father was a merchant, from a trading background, this would go on to shape John Hull's interest in projects associated with trade, notably his project to improve navigation on the river Exe. Hull trained to be a lawyer at Middle Temple, London. He married Joan French, a daughter of Walter French of Ottery St. Mary.

Career and death
He was a Member (MP) of the Parliament of England for Exeter in 1539 and 1547, during the reign of Henry VIII. He was instrumental in a project to dredge and widen the river Exe, and organised other significant engineering projects. During the western rebellion, he was in charge of Exeter's defences and resisted the attackers, after the rebellion he was made a commissioner to collect tribute for repair to the city caused by the rebellion.

At some point in his life he was a customs officer. He acted as a justice of the peace for Devon from 1543 until his sudden death in September 1549 and was buried in Exeter Cathedral. Shortly before his death he named his widow sole legatee of his estate.

References

Year of birth unknown
1549 deaths
Members of the Parliament of England (pre-1707) for Exeter
1503 births
English MPs 1539–1540
English MPs 1547–1552
English justices of the peace
Burials at Exeter Cathedral